Jif is an American brand of peanut butter made by The J.M. Smucker Company, which purchased the brand from Procter & Gamble in 2001.

In 1955, Procter & Gamble bought Big Top peanut butter and its manufacturing facilities in Lexington, Kentucky from William T. Young. In the ensuing years, the company reformulated and rebranded it to compete with Skippy and Peter Pan. P&G named its product Jif, used oils other than peanut oil in its hydrogenation process, and sweetened the recipe, adding sugar and molasses. The new product was publicly announced in April 1956, as tests of the product began in select markets. The original Creamy and Crunchy style Jif peanut butters both made their nationwide debut in 1958. In 1974, Extra Crunchy Jif was introduced, followed in 1991 by Simply Jif, a peanut butter variant with low sodium and less sugar than regular Jif. Reduced Fat Jif was introduced three years later in 1994. 

Since 1981, Jif has been the largest peanut butter brand in the United States. On May 20, 2022, their peanut butter products which were manufactured in their Lexington KY plant (only) were recalled in the USA and Canada due to potential salmonella contamination. The J.M. Smucker Company estimated a loss of $125 million as a result of the 2022 recall. On July 19, 2022, a class-action lawsuit was filed against J.M. Smucker Co. over the contaminated peanut butter.

As of July 27, 2022, 21 people in 17 states had fallen ill after consuming Jif peanut butter.

Advertising 
In 1958, the brand rollout in the U.S. involved a heavily publicized house-to-house distribution of free sample jars from special trucks emblazoned with the then Jif mascot, the "Jifaroo", a blue kangaroo. An early slogan was "Jif is never dry; a touch of honey tells you why." Early advertising also emphasized the beveled edge of the jar base, meant to make it easier to get the last bit of Jif out of the corner. For many decades, TV commercials for the product ended with the tagline, "Choosy mothers choose Jif", and, in the 1990s, "Choosy moms choose Jif." From 1998 to 2000, there was a musical jingle that accompanied many Jif ads, which used the lyrics, "Moms like you choose Jif, choose Jif!"

In February 2020, Jif announced a planned media campaign that uses the Jif brand to try to settle the GIF/Jif pronunciation debate. The company partnered with Giphy to release a special jar of Jif peanut butter that replaces the classic Jif branding on the label with 'Gif.' The advertisement tries to settle the debate by showing two jars of peanut butter with the labels Jif and Gif, with the implication of pronouncing GIF with a "hard G".

Production 

There are 10 different kinds of Jif Peanut Butter:

 Creamy
 Extra Crunchy
 No Sugar Added Creamy
 Simply Jif Creamy (low sodium and sugar)
 Omega-3 Creamy
 Reduced Fat Creamy
 Natural Creamy
 Natural Honey Creamy
 Natural Crunchy
 Coffee Creamy

Jif is also available in a three-pack and an eight-pack of 1.5-ounce individual servings of Jif peanut butter, sold under the name "Jif to Go". In 2014, Jif introduced a peanut butter-flavored breakfast cereal (manufactured under license by Kellogg's), which met with positive feedback.

On May 7, 2012, Jif announced a new line of hazelnut spreads, to be produced in Chocolate and Mocha Cappuccino flavors.

Jif also makes almond butter and cashew butter.
All variants of Jif are produced at a facility in Lexington, Kentucky, which is the largest peanut butter production facility in the world, and a smaller facility in Memphis TN whose products were not affected by the 2022 recall.

References

External links

 

Peanut butter brands
The J.M. Smucker Co. brands
Former Procter & Gamble brands
1958 establishments in Kentucky
Products introduced in 1958
Companies based in Lexington, Kentucky